Juan María Atutxa Mendiola (born May 18, 1941, in Areatza) is a politician from the Basque Country (an autonomous community in Spain) with a nationalist ideology. A member of the Basque Nationalist Party, he was Head of the Department of Interior (1991–98) and President of the Basque Parliament (1998–2005). He currently heads the Sabino Arana foundation.

Head of the Department of Interior (1991-1998)
During his term as a regional minister, he was tasked with implementing the recently passed Basque Country Police Act which the regional police body (Ertzaintza) and mandated its extension to the whole autonomous community. Since then, the criminality rates in the Basque Country have consistently ranked among the lowest in Spain according to the data published each year by the office of the Spanish Attorney General. He also implemented the Emergency Response Act, a law unifying the protocols for emergency assistance in the Basque Country, and the Spectacles Act, which mandated periodic safety inspections on buildings authorized to hold public events.

Electoral regulations were also under his responsibility. In this area, he drafted the reform of the electoral law establishing the possibility of a future use of electronic voting and leaving the actual date of implementation to the Parliament. Furthermore, the Department of Interior introduced many technological advances during his tenure, greatly increasing the pace of the scrutiny and offering election night-data over the Internet, a first in Spain.

President of the Basque Parliament (1998–2005)
In the 1998 election the Basque Nationalist Party renewed its ranks, dropping incumbent Lehendakari José Antonio Ardanza in favour of the younger, more nationalist-oriented Juan José Ibarretxe. The Presidency of the Parliament was also affected by this renovation, and incumbent President Joseba Andoni Leizaola handed over the chair to Mr. Atutxa. He stayed in office for two terms, but his third run for the head of the legislature after the 2005 election was blocked by the junior coalition partners of his party. After nine rounds of voting in a tie with the Socialist candidate Miguel Buen, he withdrew his candidacy and was replaced by his party colleague Izaskun Bilbao who won the vote.

Unfair conviction 
His tenure as president saw the enactment of the Spanish Political Parties Act, which sought to outlaw any party that did not condemn the violence of ETA; under this law, Batasuna was declared illegal by the Spanish Supreme Court, which considered that it had tangible links to ETA.

The reporting magistrate in the lawsuit was Manuel Marchena. Consequently, the court ordered the Parliament to disband the parliamentary group of the former party, Sozialista Abertzaleak, which, even though they would still be members of the Parliament, would have denied them the public money allotted to groups. Given that the standing rules of the Parliament did not contemplate the disbanding of parliamentary groups, the Basque nationalist majority in the Bureau considered that the Supreme Court's decision would require rules to be altered in order to meet it.

This started a chain of lawsuits in both the High Court of the Basque Country and the Spanish Supreme Court in which the three Bureau members were charged with an offence of contempt of court for their disobedience to a final ruling of the Supreme Court, which ignored its own Botín doctrine in order to prosecute the Basque MPs. After being initially acquitted on parliamentary immunity by the Basque High Court and an appeal by the far-right union Manos Limpias in 2007, founded by Miguel Bernard Remón, the Supreme Court sentenced him to a €18,000 fine and 18 months of disqualification for the exercise of any public office in early 2008.

In June 2017, the Strasbourg Tribunal of Human Rights condemned Spain for its irregular conviction of the Bureau members Juan Maria Atutxa, Conchi Bilbao and Gorka Knörr. Finally, eleven years on after his conviction by the Supreme Court, the same tribunal overturned it, clearing him and the MPs condemned in the same case of all offences, besides stating that the binding character of the Strasbourg tribunal's sentences for Spanish justice is "out of question".

Criticism
In the political field he sternly confronted the violence of ETA, a decision that would make him a target for the group. He was criticized by some Spanish and Basque forces for refusing to break up the parliamentary group, despite not being qualified to make that decision. He replied showing his indignation against the accusations of collusion with the group, citing his status as a potential target:

See also

 Arnaldo Otegi
 Altsasu incident (2016)
 Trial of Catalonia independence leaders

References

External links
 Basque Parliament: Juan María Atutxa - Bio 

1941 births
Basque Nationalist Party politicians
Living people
Members of the 5th Basque Parliament
Members of the 6th Basque Parliament
Members of the 7th Basque Parliament
Members of the 8th Basque Parliament
People from Arratia-Nerbioi
Presidents of the Basque Parliament